Oreopholus is a genus of bird belonging to the family Charadriidae. The tawny-throated dotterel (Oreopholus ruficollis) is the only extant species, although another species, Oreopholus orcesi, is known from the Late Pleistocene of Ecuador.

References

Bird genera
Bird genera with one living species
Charadriinae